This article is about the demographic history of Belgrade.

Ancient times
Belgrade, formerly known as Celtic Singidunum, was founded in the 3rd century B.C., near the site of a prehistoric settlement of Vinča (Vinča culture), which ranks the city among the oldest ones in Europe and the world. There are some evidence that might show that the city was also a Greek colony in the ancient times although this has not been scientifically verified. The first verifiable mention of the settlement under its ancient name, Singidunum, was in 279 B.C., which some consider to be a founding year of the city.

During the Celtic period it was a small town of several hundred, up to a thousand people, so it was more of a fishing village than a real town, even though it was fortified (which can still be seen today in Karaburma, a suburb of Belgrade). On the eve of a new era the city was taken over by the Romans and refortified; in the Roman period the importance of the city as a border- and river port spot will grow, and so would its population. In 86 A.D. Singidunum became a Roman colony under Legio IV Flavia Felix, and a golden era of the city begun; by the middle of the 2nd century, when the city has evolved into a municipium, the city has numbered some 10,000 people, roughly 6,000 of them serving for the Roman Imperial Army, and the rest being civilians. Its fort grew stronger and bigger due to continuous clashes with the Dacians. The city at that time has had its theatres, sewage system, temples and was touched by Christian movement at a very early stage. At one time it abolished its status to Rome and became an independent colony.

3rd century brought turmoil to the Empire, as it was a subject to invasions from the East, by the Goths; the city also crumbled both in population and importance, being a strategic town and suffering numerous invasions. It continued throughout 4th and 5th centuries as well, when the city was included into the Eastern Roman Empire as a guardian of its northern border; it was repeatedly sacked by Huns- under Attila himself-, Ostrogoths, Avars, Gepides, Sarmatians and Serbs. Justinian retook the city and guarded it for some 50 years, but the ancient glory was never restored. The name of the city has also been erased from the records by its new conquerors- Serbs, who renamed it Beograd (the white city), marking the beginning of a new chapter of its history.

Middle Ages
During the entire course of early-medieval times, Belgrade did not have an opportunity to evolve, as it was a subject of rivalry between the Bulgarian Empire, Byzantine Empire and Magyars. Serbs at that time had no interest in the North, as most of their states were in the South: inner Serbia, Zahumlje, Travunija, Zeta etc.; It wasn't until King Dragutin in 13th century that Belgrade was included into the Medieval Kingdom of Serbia and shaped its Orthodox rather than Magyar Catholic character. Its population gradually started to increase at that time, numbering over 10,000 by the end of the century, and 20,000 by the end of the 14th century. When Serbian Empire collapsed in 1389, more and more refugees from the south sought refuge in Belgrade. In 1403 it became the capital of Serbian Despotovina, evolving into a Christian Mecca in Turkish- occupied Balkans. Under Despot Stefan Lazarevic, who was a true European knight, poet and artist, Belgrade was a seat of a free Christian state that regulated trade between East and West. Its ancient walls and castles were reconstructed and refortified, its churches raised, its culture experienced a boom due to proximity of Oriental and Western influences, and its population soared. By 1430 Belgrade was second to Constantinople in population, by the end of the century reaching 100,000 people.

In 1430 it became part of the Kingdom of Hungary, and in 1456 it was victorious against Turks, when Christian Europe united in the city to put an end to the Siege of Belgrade. The golden age of the city continued into the 16th century. However, in 1521 the Turks conquered Belgrade. The population slowly started to decrease, as more and more colonists from Turkey poured into Belgrade, and its culture became a danger to the Porte. Serbian migrations began. In 1594, after a rebellion in Banat, many Serbs moved to the North and West, especially after the burning of St Sava's bones in the center of Belgrade by the Ottomans. Wars in today's northern Serbia, Hungary, Bosnia and Croatia encouraged many to start moving into those areas which were depopulated, as the Turkish influence was less intense in those areas. In the following century the Habsburg Empire took over most of these areas (except Bosnia), and the Serbian migration wave reached its peak in 1690 and 1737, when thousands of Serbs from Kosovo and South Serbia left their lands in hands of Muslims, moving north of the Danube into Christian Austria. The results of these migrations are still evident to this day, as Serbs became a majority in Vojvodina, much of western Bosnia, but also became a minority in Kosovo and Metohija and Sandzak.  Novi Sad would resume the title of the Serbian capital of culture and liberty in following centuries, thriving in Austria while Belgrade entirely deteriorated under Turkey. Zemun (today's northern suburb of Belgrade) became home to hundreds of refugees from today's southern Belgrade.

Modern times
The city was the seat of a revolutionary government, when First Serbian Uprising escalated against Turks, after almost three centuries of occupation. It became the seat of education when the Belgrade Higher School was founded, the oldest educational facility in the Balkans that continued to exist still today as the University of Belgrade. A National Assembly was also formed. At that time, between 1804 and 1813, on its 400th anniversary as a Serbian capital, Belgrade was a seat of the Principality of Serbia. Its population started to grow as the trade with Zemun and Austria were established; Karadjordje was supported by the Russians and French emperor Napoleon I, who came dangerously close to the country. Turks reconquered this rebelled province with much bloodshed, but a year later Second Serbian Uprising surprised them and Serbia was finally semi-independent from Turkey.

In 1817 the autonomy was proclaimed and Obrenovic dynasty started its 90-year reign in Serbia. Belgrade was reelected the capital in 1839, as its importance again grew big, being the Orthodox Christian buffer-zone between Catholic Austria and Muslim Turkey. As the feudalism was abolished the city grew rapidly in economy and in population; by 1848 it had some 40,000 residents, and by its independence in 1878 some 50,000, which is considered little but was a great improvement. The city was entirely westernized and rebuilt with nearby Vienna and Budapest being its architectural role models (during the three Austrian occupations in the past the Baroque buildings were demolished by Muslims). It also became a cultural and educational hub for the neighboring nations that were under foreign domination: Bosnia, Bulgaria, Macedonia, etc. However the economy of Kingdom of Serbia was weak and the nation was still divided, now living in three states. Serbia lived out of livestock and agriculture, although Belgrade as a city was increasingly modern, getting a train rail in 1882, its trams, electricity and even cinema at the end of the 19th century, becoming thus the most developed city in the Balkans. By 1900 the city reached 70,000 people, which means that it still hasn't reached its medieval population-level, but by the outbreak of World War I, due to rapid growth, the city has finally reached 100,000 residents, again ranking third only behind Constantinople but also Romanian Bucharest.

World War I left this Allied country devastated, having lost 33% of its entire population. Belgrade, being unprotected and opened to Austria with its two rivers, has also been largely demolished. During the war the population fell down to only about 20,000, but soon after the war ended and Kingdom of Serbs, Croats and Slovenes was formed, the city gained a large influx of population, largely Serbs from devastated areas but also Western Serbs. It was the first time in history that these 2 cities, one against another Belgrade and Zemun, have had a chance to unite. This occurred in 1929 and the combined population was 240,000 people; a decade later it reached 350,000 and by the outbreak of World War II Belgrade had 400,000 people.
World War II saw a big destruction in Belgrade; thousands have died in Luftwaffe air raids, and tens of thousands in concentration camps on Staro Sajmiste, Banjica, Jajinci and so on. However Belgrade recovered quite quickly after the war, and as a capital of Yugoslavia, becoming an industrial hub of the nation while its cultural values were set aside in advantage to Zagreb, second largest city. The population growth was huge; between 1948 and 1971 the city population more than doubled, from nearly 400,000 in 1948 to around 900,000 in 1971, and the city finally passed 1 million mark in 1981 when it reached population of 1,087,915 inhabitants. The 1990s saw wars and economic collapse caused by the UN sanctions; some 300,000 left the country, especially young people, while on the other hand, more than a half a million Serb refugees from Croatia, Kosovo and Bosnia-Herzegovina have found shelter in Serbia and Belgrade. Results from the 2011 census showed that the population of the Belgrade proper is at 1,166,736 while urban population of Belgrade (which, besides settlement of Belgrade, include three other urban settlements: Borča, Ovča and Surčin) currently stands at 1,233,796.

References

History of Belgrade
Belgrade